Suzanne Haik could refer to: 

Suzanne Haik Terrell (born 1954), American politician
Suzanne Haïk-Vantoura (1912–2000), French organist and composer